Andrija Radulović  (Cyrillic: Aндрија Радуловић; born February 3, 1970, in Podgorica, Montenegro) is a prominent Montenegrin poet. He studied history at the Faculty of Philosophy at University of Montenegro and graduated as professor of education from Faculty of education, University of Novi Sad (Serbia).
He writes poetry, literary criticism, essays and translates from the Russian language. 
His poetry is presented in several national and international anthologies, while his literary work has been translated into twenty four languages.
He lives in Podgorica. Radulovic was one of the editors of two literary magazines of the Association of Writers of Montenegro, "Square" and "Literary Record".

Radulovic received a number of national and international awards for his prose and poetry, most notable being:

 I nagrada Vidovdanskog sajma knjiga, Podgorica, Montenegro, 2003, (for poetry)
 Gramota, Sofia, Bulgaria, 2003, (for poetry)
 Nosside,(UNESCO, World Poetry Directory), Reggio Calabria, Italy, 2005
 Aninoasa, Trgoviste, Romania 2006, (for poetry and cultural achievements)
 Božidar Vuković Podgoričanin, Podgorica, Montenegro 2008
 Kočićevo pero, Banja Luka, Bosnia and Hercegovina, 2008
 Zlatna značka KPZ Srbije, Belgrade, Serbia 2008, (for literature and editorial work)
 Vukova povelja, Loznica, Serbia, 2008, (for distinguished achievements in national culture)
 Marko Miljanov, Podgorica, Montenegro, 2009, (for poetry, Montenegrin Writers Association)
 Золотое перо Руси, Moscow, Russia, 2009, (Laureate for poetry and for its translated poems in Russian)
 Naji Naaman, Lebanon, 2010, (Creativity Prize)
 Tverska Gramota, Tver, Russia, 2011
 Boris Kornilov, Sankt Peterburg, Russia, 2012
 Balkanika, Braila, Romania, 2012
 Simo Matavulj, Belgrade,  Serbia, 2014
 Pečat varoši sremskokarlovačke, Sremski Karlovci, Serbia, 2021
 Radoje Domanović, Serbia, 2022

Published works 
 Pogled s mosta (A view of the bridge), Podgorica, 1994
 Znak u pijesku (A sign in the sand), Herceg Novi, 1995
 Ponoć na Donu (Midnight at Don), Podgorica, 1997
 Ognjeno rebro (Fire Bone), Andrijevica, 1998
 Riječ sa juga – Слово с Юга (A word from the South), in Serbian and Russian,  Podgorica, 2000
 Anđeo u pšenici (Angel in the wheat), Podgorica, 2002
 Oгнено ребро (Fire Bone), in Bulgarian, Sofia, 2003
 Coasta de foc (Fire Bone), in Romanian, Targoviste, 2006
 Sniježna azbuka (Snow alphabet), Podgorica, 2007
 Zvono (Bell), Podgorica, 2008
 Bivše kraljevstvo (The Former Kingdom), Podgorica, 2010
 Снежня азбука , ( Snow alphabet ), in Russian, Tver, 2011
 Snežna azbuka ( Snow alphabet ),  in Slovenian, Ljubljana, 2013
 Bijela pčela Volta Vitmena ( White Bee of Walt Whitman), Podgorica-Beograd, 2015
 Kad bih plakao kao vinograd ( If I Could Cry as a Vineyard), Podgorica-Beograd, 2018
 General i lasta (General and Swallow), Podgorica, 2021

References 

 Radulović, Andrija, Bivše kraljevstvo, UKCG, Podgorica, 2010
 Дни Негоша в Петербурге, (Njegos Days in St. Petersburg), St. Petersburg State University, 
 Lirikon 21 : mednarodna revija za poezijo XXI .st.  Planeti  z lastno svetlobo –festivalna antologija : 100 pesnikov in pesnic XXI. st. Iz 21 evropskih literatur, 2017
 Antologija dobitnika nagrade „Marko Miljanov“ : Udruženje književnika Crne Gore, 2017
 SQUARE ( Journal of the Association of Writers of Montenegro), 2019

External links 
 Metafora, Andrija Radulović, two poems (in Serbian) 
 Zetna, Andrija Radulović, poems (in Serbian and in Hungarian)  
 Modern Galery Budva, Evning with poet Andrija Radulović (in Serbian) 

1970 births
Living people
Writers from Podgorica
Montenegrin poets
Montenegrin male writers
Montenegrin translators
Serbian male poets
Christian writers
University of Novi Sad alumni
Translators from Russian